Shuishang Township (meaning "near water") is a rural township in Chiayi County, Taiwan.

History
After the handover of Taiwan from Japan to the Republic of China in 1945, Shuishang was established as part of Tainan County. In 1946, it was incorporated into Chiayi City as a district. In 1950, Chiayi County was established after being separated from Tainan County and Shuishang was made a rural township of Chiayi County.

Geography
The Taiwanese township has a population total of 48,164 and an area of 69.1198 km2.

Administrative divisions
The township comprises 25 villages: Cuxi, Daku, Dalun, Guoxing, Huigui, Jinghe, Kuanshi, Liulin, Liuxiang, Liuxin, Longde, Minsheng, Nanhe, Nanxiang, Neixi, Sanhe, Sanjie, Sanzeng, Shuishang, Shuitou, Tugou, Xialiao, Xizhou, Yixing, Zhonghe and Zhongzhuang.

Tourist attractions
 Tropic of Cancer Monument

Transportation

Air
The township houses the Chiayi Airport.

Rails

 TRA Nanjing Station
 TRA Shuishang Station

Roads
The township is connected to Dongshi Township through Provincial Highway 82.

External links

 Shueishang Township Office

Townships in Chiayi County